NewsBank is a news database resource that provides archives of media publications as reference materials to libraries.

History
John Naisbitt, the author of the book Megatrends, founded NewsBank. The company was launched in 1972. NewsBank was bought from Naisbitt by Daniel S. Jones, who subsequently became its president. Naisbitt left NewsBank in 1973. In 1983, NewsBank acquired Readex. With the completion of the merger, NewsBank had acquired one of the earliest organizations in America to archive microform.

In 1986, NewsBank had one hundred employees in-house. Another one hundred employees worked from home and traveled to the company's headquarters, bringing back newspapers to their residence from there, and then coming back to the company with indexed information on these publications. The company's headquarters in 1986 was in New Canaan, Connecticut.

Chris Andrews was brought on in 1986 as product manager for CD-ROM. His job was to help the company transition from a paper format of delivery to libraries, so that its indexes and full-text articles were available in CD-ROM format. The subscription price for this service initially was US$5,000 per library. Visitors to libraries found that their search time was cut from 30 minutes using paper indexes to five minutes using CD-ROM. NewsBank used an arbitrary selection process for determining which news articles the company considered worthy for archiving; it based their selection on articles that were more likely to be widely appealing to a larger potential audience of future researchers, not simply stories of regional interest.

In 1992, NewsBank had difficulty providing its users with a method to search for information based upon a specific location. Newspaper results were listed by subject matter first and then subsequently by location. At the time, it indexed articles via microfiche from more than 400 media publications in the United States. The company announced in 1993 a CD-ROM product indexing full text of 35 publications including The Christian Science Monitor, The Washington Post, Los Angeles Times, The Dallas Morning News, Chicago Tribune, The Boston Globe, and The Atlanta Journal-Constitution.

In 1994, NewsBank was the only company providing researchers access to an index to periodical literature in the subject of theater with its NewsBank's Review of the Arts: Performing Arts on CD-ROM. NewsBank started compiling the full text of articles related to the local economy of geographic areas and providing this information via CD-ROM to its clients in 1994. The privately held company was cited by The Information Advisor as bringing in annual revenue of approximately $19 million, and employing a staff of 350 people. By 1998, NewsBank provided indexes via CD-ROM to newspaper articles from over 450 cities in the United States.

In 2001, NewsBank compiled the Foreign Broadcast Information Service index and made it available via CD-ROM. NewsBank joined forces with Micromedia, Ltd., a division of IHS Canada, to help distribute its products in 2001. In 2004 NewsBank maintained archival access to hundreds of media references since 1996. In 2005, NewsBank was structured in a pay-for-use format, with access differentiated for different types of users including public libraries, public schools, as well as higher education settings.

NewsBank reached an agreement in 2011 with The Daily Northwestern newspaper of Northwestern University to archive all of its historical publications. The task archived more than 90,000 pages of material from the school. It included a plan to archive not just The Daily Northwestern but also prior related publications from 1871 to 2000, and index the material so it could be keyword searchable on the Internet. Dan Jones, President and CEO of NewsBank, had a prior relationship with the university, serving as a university trustee and president-elect of the Northwestern Alumni Association.

In 2013, NewsBank provided users with its service Access World News, which Reference Skills for the School Librarian called the "world's largest full-text news database". According to the book Communication and Language Analysis in the Public Sphere, in 2014 NewsBank contained "over 990 news sources, with each state in the U.S. represented, as well as national publications, television and radio programs."

NewsBank's offerings include a Black Life in America archive.

Reception
The 2004 book Reference Sources in History by Ronald H. Fritze, Brian E. Coutts, and Louis Andrew Vyhnanek wrote that: "NewsBank is one of the world's largest information providers." In her book Journalism: A Guide to the Reference Literature (2004), Jo A. Cates said: "NewsBank is a massive database, the NewsFile Collection alone providing access to full text articles in more than 500 newspapers, wire services, and broadcasts." The 2013 book Reference Skills for the School Librarian by authors Ann Marlow Riedling, Loretta Shake, and Cynthia Houston called NewsBank a "popular indexing series". They pointed out that NewsBank provided access to "an easy-to-search database of articles, activities, and lesson plans for the elementary and middle grades, covering key issues and events in every subject area."

See also
GenealogyBank.com
HighBeam Research
LexisNexis
Westlaw

Notes

References

Further reading

External links

Companies based in Naples, Florida
Online mass media companies of the United States
Internet search engines
Online archives of the United States
Bibliographic database providers
Bibliographic databases and indexes